Tuttilik (old spelling Tugtilik), also known as Lake Fjord, is a fjord in the municipality of Sermersooq, southeastern Greenland.

Tundra climate prevails in the region of the fjord, the average annual temperature in the area being . The fjord is free of ice between July and October in average years.

History
Tugtilik probably means "the place where the reindeer live" (tugto is Greenlandic for reindeer) and the river flowing into the fjord from the lake is rich in Arctic char. It is likely to have been settled by Inuit hunters for centuries. There are the remains of at least nine winter houses on the south and west side of the fjord, but all were abandoned by the 20th century.

Following the success of his British Arctic Air Route Expedition of 1930–31, Gino Watkins returned to Tugtilik, or as he called it, Lake Fjord, in 1932 on the East Greenland Expedition to continue the exploration work with a smaller team. A purpose of the expedition was to take metrological observations around the lake, the only place in the area where planes could land on skis or floats, without the hazard of icebergs and pack ice. On 20 August 1932, he would die in this fjord after he went hunting for seals in its waters. Later that day his empty kayak was found floating upside down by his companions. His body was never found.
  
A monument to Watkins stands on the rocky promontory between the main fjord and the westerly branch. The remains of the hunting hut of the 1932–33 East Greenland Expedition (Rejsehus) is at the head of the shallow western branch of the fjord.

Geography

Tuttilik is a small fjord of the King Christian IX Land coast located east of Nigertuluk Fjord and south of the Southern K.J.V. Steenstrup Glacier.

To the south the fjord opens into the North Atlantic Ocean near Cape Wandel. Ailsa Island lies at the mouth of the fjord, named after Ailsa Craig in the Firth of Clyde in Scotland.

Gallery

See also

John Rymill
List of fjords of Greenland

Bibliography
Spencer Apollonio, Lands That Hold One Spellbound: A Story of East Greenland, 2008

References

External links
East Greenland – in the footsteps of Gino Watkins
Picture - On way to Watkins "Lake Fjord"
Greenland 1932 and 1967

Fjords of Greenland